alpha-Mannosidase (alpha-D-mannosidase, p-nitrophenyl-alpha-mannosidase, alpha-D-mannopyranosidase, 1,2-alpha-mannosidase, 1,2-alpha-D-mannosidase, exo-alpha-mannosidase) is an enzyme involved in the cleavage of the alpha form of mannose. Its systematic name is alpha-D-mannoside mannohydrolase.

Isozymes 

Humans express the following  three alpha-mannosidase isozymes:

Applications 

It can be utilized in experiments that determine the effects of the presence or absence of mannose on specific molecules, such as recombinant proteins that are used in vaccine development.

Pathology
A deficiency can lead to alpha-mannosidosis.

References

External links
 GeneReviews/NCBI/NIH/UW entry on Alpha-Mannosidosis
 OMIM entries on Alpha-Mannosidosis

EC 3.2.1